Henry Scott, 3rd Duke of Buccleuch and 5th Duke of Queensberry KG FRSE (2 September 174611 January 1812) was a Scottish nobleman and long-time friend of Sir Walter Scott. He is the paternal 3rd great-grandfather of Princess Alice, Duchess of Gloucester, and the maternal 4th great-grandfather of Prince William of Gloucester and Prince Richard, Duke of Gloucester.

Much of the family's lands and wealth were accumulated during Henry's tenure as duke. He integrated the surnames "Montagu" and "Douglas" with the Scott family name to form the unhyphenated compound surname "Montagu Douglas Scott".

Early life
Henry Scott was the fourth child of five born to Francis Scott, Earl of Dalkeith (son of Francis Scott, 2nd Duke of Buccleuch), and his wife, Caroline Campbell, and the third-born and only surviving male heir. He was baptised on 29 September 1746 at St. George's Church, St George Street, Hanover Square, London, England. His father, Francis Scott, died of smallpox at the age of 29, just one year before the death of Henry's grandfather, the 2nd Duke of Buccleuch. It was young Henry who succeeded his grandfather as Duke of Buccleuch on 22 April 1751, at the age of four.

Educated at Eton College, through his stepfather Charles Townshend, Henry was given the opportunity to travel abroad with Adam Smith as his tutor from 1764 to 1766. The Duke remained lifelong friends with Smith and is credited with bringing him out of his shell.

Marriage and family
On 2 May 1767, he married Lady Elizabeth Montagu, the eldest daughter of Lady Mary Montagu and George (Brudenell) Montagu, 1st Duke of Montagu. The couple were married in Montagu House, Whitehall, London. Elizabeth's maternal and paternal grandparents were, respectively, Sir John Montagu, 2nd Duke of Montagu and Lady Mary Churchill, and George Brudenell, 3rd Earl of Cardigan and Lady Elizabeth Bruce. Two of her maternal great-grandparents were John Churchill, 1st Duke of Marlborough and Lady Sarah Jenyns (later Churchill).

Henry and Elizabeth had seven children together:

George Scott, Earl of Dalkeith (25 March 176829 May 1768)
Lady Mary Scott (21 May 176921 April 1823), married James Stopford, 3rd Earl of Courtown, and had issue.
Lady Elizabeth Scott (10 October 1770 - 29 June 1837), married Alexander Home, 10th Earl of Home and had issue.
Sir Charles William Henry Montagu Scott, 4th Duke of Buccleuch & 6th Duke of Queensberry (24 May 177220 April 1819)
Lady Caroline Scott (6 July 177429 April 1854), married Charles Douglas, 6th Marquess of Queensberry and had issue.
Henry James Montagu Scott, 2nd Baron Montagu of Boughton (16 December 177630 October 1845)
Lady Harriet Scott (1 December 178018 April 1833), married William Kerr, 6th Marquess of Lothian and had issue.

The origin of the Montagu Douglas Scott surname

The Montagu line

When John Montagu, 2nd Duke of Montagu, died on 5 July 1749, his estate had been entailed to his daughter, Mary, who was married to George Montagu, 1st Duke of Montagu. The Montagu peerages, like most English peerages, were limited to male heirs, and became extinct with the 2nd Duke. However, within ten days after Montagu's death, Cardigan adopted the Montagu name and coat of arms for both himself and his two children, in order that the Montagu name should continue. Seventeen years later, in 1766, King George III created him Duke of Montagu and Marquess of Monthermer.

The first duke of the 1766 creation died on 23 May 1790—also survived only by a daughter, Elizabeth, now Duchess of Buccleuch. Once again the Montagu peerages became extinct. Elizabeth inherited only the unentailed Montagu assets, which included Boughton House in Weekley, Northamptonshire. Like his father-in-law, Buccleuch wished to perpetuate the Montagu name, and adopted the unhyphenated surname Montagu Scott.

The Douglas line
William Douglas, 4th Duke of Queensberry never married; when he died on 23 December 1810, his peerages and entailments passed to his 2nd cousin once removed, Sir Henry Montagu Scott, 3rd Duke of Buccleuch, through Sir Henry's grandmother, Lady Jane Douglas, Queensberry's first cousin once removed. Buccleuch then added the surname to his own, forming the unhyphenated surname Montagu Douglas Scott which the family bears to this day.

Career

Buccleuch was Governor of the Royal Bank of Scotland from 1777 to 1812. He was joint founder of the Royal Society of Edinburgh and its first President, serving from 1783 until his death in 1812. He was Lord Lieutenant of Midlothian and of Haddington from 1794 to 1812. He was also appointed a deputy lieutenant of Northamptonshire on 9 May 1803.

In 1778, when Britain was threatened with invasion by France and Spain during the American War of Independence, he raised a regiment of Fencibles at Dalkeith, the South Fencible Regiment or 'Southern regiment of Fencible Men' on 10 April and commanded it as Colonel until its disbandment on 1 April 1783. In the French Revolutionary Wars he raised and commanded a Volunteer unit, the 2nd Royal Edinburgh Volunteers, from 1797 until the Scottish Militia was authorised by Parliament in 1798. He was then instructed to raise the 10th North British Militia to which (as lord-lieutenant) he appointed himself colonel. He commanded the regiment and its successor the Edinburgh (County and City) Militia, and occasionally the Scottish Militia Brigade, until his resignation in 1811.

Death
Buccleuch died at Dalkeith Palace, Midlothian, Scotland, on 11 January 1812, aged 65. He was buried in the family crypt of the Buccleuch Memorial Chapel in St. Mary's Episcopal Church, Dalkeith, Midlothian. The church is located on High Street in Dalkeith, at the entrance to Dalkeith Country Park.

Titles, honours and awards
31 January 174831 March 1750: Lord Eskdaill
1 April 175021 April 1751: Earl of Dalkeith
22 April 175122 December 1810: His Grace The Duke of Buccleuch
1778–1812: Captain General of the Royal Company of Archers
1767: Appointed Knight of the Thistle (KT)
1794: Appointed Knight of the Garter (KG) (resigning as Knight of the Thistle)
1802: Inherited the Lordship of Bowland from his wife's brother-in-law, 1st Earl Beaulieu
23 December 181011 January 1812: His Grace The Duke of Buccleuch and of Queensberry

References

|-

105
203
Knights of the Garter
Knights of the Thistle
Lord-Lieutenants of Midlothian
Lord-Lieutenants of Roxburghshire
Edinburgh Militia officers
Presidents of the Royal Society of Edinburgh
1746 births
1812 deaths
People educated at Eton College
H
Founder Fellows of the Royal Society of Edinburgh
Members of the Royal Company of Archers
18th-century Scottish landowners
Deputy Lieutenants of Northamptonshire
19th-century Scottish landowners